Verkhneye Yuldashevo (Ürge Yuldaş) is a rural locality (a village) in Yabalakovsky Selsoviet, Ilishevsky District, Bashkortostan, Russia. The population was 216 as of 2010. There are 3 streets.

Geography 
Verkhneye Yuldashevo is located 36 km north of Verkhneyarkeyevo (the district's administrative centre) by road. Starokirgizovo is the nearest rural locality.

References 

Rural localities in Ilishevsky District